The 1983–84 La Liga season, the 53rd since its establishment, started on September 3, 1983, and finished on April 29, 1984.

Teams and locations

League table

Results table

Pichichi Trophy 

La Liga seasons
1983–84 in Spanish football leagues
Spain